Yang Zhaoxuan (born 11 February 1995) is a Chinese professional tennis player.
She reached her best doubles ranking of world No. 9 in the WTA doubles rankings on 30 January 2023.

Yang has won six doubles titles on the WTA Tour and one WTA Challenger doubles title. On 14 September 2015, she reached her best singles ranking of world No. 151. She also has three singles and 12 doubles titles on the ITF Circuit.

Career

2014: WTA debut
Yang made her WTA Tour debut at the 2014 Shenzhen Open, partnering Ye Qiuyu in doubles. The pair lost their first-round match against third seeds Irina Buryachok and Oksana Kalashnikova.

2017: First WTA 1000 final
In 2017, she reached the final of the Wuhan Open alongside Shuko Aoyama. They lost to Latisha Chan and Martina Hingis in the final. At the WTA Elite Trophy, she lost both matches in the round robin together with Han Xinyun.

2018: First Grand Slam doubles semifinal
At the 2018 French Open, Yang alongside Chan Hao-ching reached her first Grand Slam semifinal but then lost to Eri Hozumi and Makoto Ninomiya.

2019: First Grand Slam mixed doubles semifinal 
At the 2019 Wimbledon Championships, she reached the semifinal in mixed doubles alongside Matwé Middelkoop, after overcoming the top-seeded couple of Nicole Melichar and Bruno Soares. They lost their semifinal match to Jeļena Ostapenko and Robert Lindstedt.

2021: Second WTA 1000 final
In March 2021, Yang reached the final of the Dubai Championships along with Xu Yifan but they lost to Alexa Guarachi and Darija Jurak.

2022: WTA 1000 doubles title 
In 2022 at the WTA 1000 in Indian Wells, she won the biggest title of her career in doubles with Xu Yifan.
She qualified for the 2022 WTA Finals with partner Yifan.

2023: Top 10 debut, First Grand Slam quarterfinal
She reached the quarterfinals at the 2023 Australian Open partnering Chan Hao-ching.
As a result she reached a new career high ranking of world No. 9 on 30 January 2023.

Performance timeline
Only main-draw results in WTA Tour, Grand Slam tournaments, Fed Cup/Billie Jean King Cup and Olympic Games are included in win–loss records.

Doubles
Current through the 2023 Dubai Open.

Significant finals

WTA Elite Trophy

Doubles: 2 (2 runner–ups)

WTA 1000 finals

Doubles: 3 (1 title, 2 runner-ups)

WTA career finals

Doubles: 14 (6 titles, 8 runner-ups)

WTA Challenger finals

Doubles: 2 (1 title, 1 runner-up)

ITF Circuit finals

Singles: 4 (3 titles, 1 runner–up)

Doubles: 24 (12 titles, 12 runner–ups)

Notes

References

External links

 
 
 

1995 births
Living people
Chinese female tennis players
Tennis players at the 2018 Asian Games
Medalists at the 2018 Asian Games
Asian Games medalists in tennis
Asian Games gold medalists for China
Tennis players from Beijing
Olympic tennis players of China
Tennis players at the 2020 Summer Olympics
21st-century Chinese women